David Smith (born April 20, 1982) is a New York based stand-up comedian and libertarian political commentator. He has frequently appeared on Fox News Channel's Kennedy and The Greg Gutfeld Show. Additionally he was a recurring panelist on CNN's  S.E. Cupp: Unfiltered.

Career
In 2013 Smith was featured as one of the New Faces at the Just for Laughs Comedy Festival in Montreal. He was also a featured performer on the New York Comedy Festival's "New York's Funniest" showcase in 2014 and 2015. He has appeared several times on The Joe Rogan Experience. He hosts the Part of the Problem podcast and cohosts the comedy podcast Legion of Skanks. He was also the emcee for FreedomFest, a libertarian festival, in 2021.

Involvement in the Libertarian movement

Smith has been publicly associated with both the libertarian movement and the Libertarian Party. Smith is a member of the Mises Caucus, and has publicly weighed seeking the Libertarian Party nomination for president in 2024, with their support. He has stated that the libertarian movement and Party should be more active in combating what he sees as big tech hegemony and has described this angle as "the biggest threat to liberty", aside from the "tyranny of COVID-19." Smith has identified economist Murray Rothbard as a primary source of inspiration.

Criticism
Smith has been noted for interviews with far-right figures such as Gavin McInnes and neo-Nazis such as Richard Spencer and Christopher Cantwell. In 2021, The New Republic called Smith, who is Jewish, "a 'Nazi sympathizer' who believes Jews run forces that are killing the society'".

See also
Mises Caucus

References

External links

1982 births
Living people
American anarcho-capitalists
American libertarians
People from New York City
American Jews